Guy Jenkin (born 27 April 1955) is a British film director and comedy writer who is best known for working together with Andy Hamilton on sitcoms and comedies such as Drop the Dead Donkey (1990–1998), Outnumbered (2007–2014), and Ballot Monkeys (2015).

Early life
He attended Trinity College, Cambridge.

Career
He wrote the 2002 satirical comedy Jeffrey Archer: The Truth, with Damian Lewis portraying Jeffrey Archer, and the 2003 drama film The Sleeping Dictionary, starring Jessica Alba.

Jenkin also contributed to the popular 2006–2007 BBC series Life on Mars, writing the sixth episode of the second series about heroin in 1973 and the Asian community. The episode explores racism at the time.

Personal life
Jenkin is married to Bernadette Davis, the creator and writer of Some Girls. He lives in Balham in south London.

References

External links

British comedy writers
Living people
Alumni of Trinity College, Cambridge
People from Balham
1955 births